Pewee Valley is a home rule-class city in Oldham County, Kentucky, United States. The population was 1,456 at the 2010 census.

History
The site of present-day Pewee Valley was first settled as a stop on the Louisville and Frankfort Railroad in 1852 under the name Smith's Station, although it remains unclear which Smith gave his name to the community. It may have been Henry S. Smith, the son of a local pioneer, or Thomas Smith, a local shopkeep. The name was changed to Pewee Valley on the establishment of a post office by Henry's son Charles Franklin Smith in 1856. The name refers to the eastern wood pewee, a local bird, but, as the town lies on a ridge, the reason for naming the settlement a "valley" remains obscure.

Geography
Pewee Valley is located at  (38.309552, -85.489137).

Demographics

As of the census of 2000, there were 1,436 people, 484 households, and 394 families residing in the city. The racial makeup of the city was 96.10% White, 2.37% African American, 0.28% Asian, 0.56% from other races, and 0.70% from two or more races. Hispanic or Latino of any race were 2.02% of the population.

There were 484 households, out of which 33.7% had children under the age of 18 living with them, 73.3% were married couples living together, 6.4% had a female householder with no husband present, and 18.4% were non-families. 15.7% of all households were made up of individuals, and 7.9% had someone living alone who was 65 years of age or older. The average household size was 2.71 and the average family size was 3.04.

In the city, the population was spread out, with 23.6% under the age of 18, 4.9% from 18 to 24, 20.3% from 25 to 44, 31.0% from 45 to 64, and 20.2% who were 65 years of age or older. The median age was 46 years. For every 100 females, there were 87.0 males. For every 100 females age 18 and over, there were 82.5 males.

The median income for a household in the city was $71,625, and the median income for a family was $81,639. Males had a median income of $65,556 versus $33,571 for females. The per capita income for the city was $31,845. About 2.0% of families and 3.8% of the population were below the poverty line, including 6.7% of those under age 18 and 3.9% of those age 65 or over.

References

External links
 Official homepage
 Kate Matthews Collection(scenes of people and places in Pewee Valley at the turn of the 20th century) from the University of Louisville Libraries
"Pewee Valley: Smith's Station Was Seed for Growth; Emphasis on the Aesthetic Arose from an Artistic Outlook" — Article by Angela Struck of The Courier-Journal

 
Cities in Oldham County, Kentucky
Cities in Kentucky
Louisville metropolitan area
Populated places established in 1852
1852 establishments in Kentucky